Marinagua! is a 1981 role-playing game supplement published by Group One for Traveller.

Contents
Marinagua! is an adventure setting for the Theta Borealis sector.

Publication history
Marinagua! was published in 1981 by Group One as a 32-page book.

Reception
William A. Barton reviewed Marinagua in The Space Gamer No. 49. Barton commented that "Marinagua has little to recommend it over past G1 adventures (and nothing over recent Traveler adventures by other companies). For completists only."

References

Role-playing game supplements introduced in 1981
Traveller (role-playing game) supplements